Comparison of multi-model databases (database management systems).

See also 
 Comparison of structured storage software

Multi-model databases